Pow Pow may refer to:

"Pow Pow" (song), 2010 song by American rock band LCD Soundsystem
"Pow Pow", 2013 single by LPG (South Korean group)
Christopher Powell (musician), 21st-century American drummer who performs under the stage name Pow Pow

See also
POW (disambiguation)
Pao Pao (disambiguation)
Bang Bang (disambiguation)